Belippo attenuata is a jumping spider species in the genus Belippo that lives in Lesotho. It was first identified in 2014.

References

Fauna of Lesotho
Salticidae
Spiders described in 2014
Spiders of Africa
Taxa named by Wanda Wesołowska